Lohardaga Lok Sabha constituency is one of the 14 Lok Sabha (parliamentary) constituencies in Jharkhand state in eastern India. Presently this constituency is reserved for the candidates belonging to the Scheduled tribes. This constituency covers the entire Gumla and Lohardaga districts and part of Ranchi district.

Assembly segments
Presently, Lohardaga Lok Sabha constituency comprises the following five Vidhan Sabha (legislative assembly) segments:

Members of Parliament
1957: Ignace Beck, Jharkhand Party
1962: David Munzni, Indian National Congress
1967: Kartik Oraon, Indian National Congress
1971: Kartik Oraon, Indian National Congress
1977: Laloo Oraon, Janata Party
1980: Kartik Oraon, Indian National Congress
1984: Sumati Oraon, Indian National Congress
1989: Sumati Oraon, Indian National Congress
1991: Lalit Oraon, Bharatiya Janata Party
1996: Lalit Oraon, Bharatiya Janata Party
1998: Indra Nath Bhagat, Indian National Congress
1999: Dukha Bhagat, Bharatiya Janata Party
2004: Rameshwar Oraon, Indian National Congress
2009: Sudarshan Bhagat, Bharatiya Janata Party
2014: Sudarshan Bhagat, Bharatiya Janata Party
2019: Sudarshan Bhagat, Bharatiya Janata Party

Election results

17th Lok Sabha: 2019 General Elections

See also
 Lohardaga district
 Gumla district
 List of Constituencies of the Lok Sabha

Notes

Lok Sabha constituencies in Jharkhand
Lohardaga district
Gumla district